The second USS Newark (SP-266) was a United States Navy minesweeper and tug in commission from 1917 to 1919.

Newark was built as a commercial tug of the same name in 1913 by the Skinner Shipbuilding Company at Baltimore, Maryland. The U.S. Navy acquired her from her owner, the Delaware, Lackawanna and Western Railroad Company, on 18 August 1917 for World War I service as a minesweeper and tug. She was commissioned on 23 September 1917 as USS Newark (SP-266).

Operating in the 3rd Naval District (headquartered at New York City) during World War I, Newark got under way on 26 September 1917 as a minesweeper in and around New York City, berthing at Marine Basin. She steamed on patrol to Whitestone, Long Island, New York on 4 January 1918. In February, she operated as a tug, breaking ice in Marine Basin, helping six submarine chasers out of the harbor, and towing ships from docks to coal barges. In May, she resumed minesweeping activities, operating in Ambrose Channel.

Newark was decommissioned on 15 May and was sold on 19 May.

References

External links
 NavSource Online: Section Patrol Craft Photo Archive Newark (SP 266)

1913 ships
Ships built in Baltimore
Minesweepers of the United States Navy
Tugs of the United States Navy
World War I auxiliary ships of the United States
World War I minesweepers of the United States